Gennady Panin (born June 13, 1981, Vereya, Orekhovo-Zuevsky urban district) is a Russian political figure and a deputy of the 8th State Duma. 

At the beginning of the 2000s, Panin engaged in business. In 2003, he joined the Young Guard of United Russia. From 2008 to 2014, Panin was the deputy of the Council of Deputies of Orekhovo-Zuyevo City District. From 2009 to 2014, he was the Chairman of the Council of Deputies of the city district of Orekhovo-Zuyevo. From 2014 to 2021, Panin was the head of the Orekhovo-Zuyevo City District. On September 14, 2016, Panin was appointed the head of the municipality. He left the post in 2021 when he was elected deputy of the 8th State Duma.

References

1981 births
Living people
United Russia politicians
21st-century Russian politicians
Eighth convocation members of the State Duma (Russian Federation)
People from Moscow Oblast
Russian Presidential Academy of National Economy and Public Administration alumni